Lake Taymyr is a lake of the central regions of the Taymyr Peninsula in Krasnoyarsk Krai, Russian Federation. It is located south of the Byrranga Mountains.

Geography

Lake Taymyr is large, with a length of 165 km roughly east-to-west. It has an irregular shape with many arms projecting in different directions that cover a wide region. Its maximum width, however, is only about 23 km in its broadest area which is towards the eastern end of the lake.

Lake Taymyr is covered with ice from late September until June. The main river flowing into its basin, from the west, is the Upper Taymyra. Other rivers flowing into it are the Zapadnaya, Severnaya, Bikada-Nguoma, Yamu-Tarida and Kalamissamo. The Lower Taymyra flows out of the lake northwards across the Byrranga mountain region.

The tundra areas south of Lake Taymyr are full of smaller lakes and marshes. There are two quite large lakes east and southeast of the easternmost part of Lake Taymyr, which is Yamuneru Bay: 33 km east is Lake Kungusalakh, and 72 km southeast is Lake Portnyagino. Both lakes are about 20 km across.

Ecology
Lake Taymyr is teeming with many kinds of fish typical of cold Arctic waters, like loach, sig, and muksun. But there is overexploitation of some fish species despite the remoteness of the area.

Slight plutonium contamination has been detected in the sediments of Lake Taymyr. This is perhaps a consequence of wind-carried particles after the numerous atmospheric nuclear tests in Novaya Zemlya during the Cold War.

Water temperatures
 Average water temperature in August: +7 °C
 During winter, water temperature is slightly above 1 °C

References

External links

 Encyclopedia.com
 Taymyr area information and pictures
 Geological and paleontological data

Biosphere reserves of Russia
Taymyr
North Siberian Lowland